The National Government of August–October 1931, also known as the First National Government, was the first of a series of national governments formed during the Great Depression in the United Kingdom.  It was formed by Ramsay MacDonald as Prime Minister of the United Kingdom following the collapse of the previous minority government, led by the Labour Party, known as the Second MacDonald ministry.

As a National Government, it contained members of the Conservative Party, Liberals and National Labour, as well as a number of individuals who belonged to no political party. The breakaway Liberal Nationals supported the National Government after their formation in September 1931 but none received posts in the new administration. Subsequently two Liberal ministers, Alec Glassey and John Pybus, defected to the Liberal Nationals. It did not contain members of the Labour Party as MacDonald had been expelled from it.  The Labour Party led the opposition.

Viewed by many Labour supporters as a traitor, MacDonald was expelled from the Labour Party, and remained a hated figure within the Labour Party for many years thereafter, despite his great services to his party earlier in his life.

Formation

The outgoing Labour cabinet, which was a minority government, was unable to agree upon proposals to cut public expenditure.  Prime Minister MacDonald submitted his resignation to King George V on 24 August 1931.

The new Ministry was formed on 24 August 1931, when MacDonald was re-appointed Prime Minister. A smaller-than-usual cabinet was appointed the following day. The King persuaded MacDonald that it was his duty to form a new government to address the financial crisis. The original idea was that the National Government would be free to draw upon the talents of members of all parties, so that it would represent the nation as a whole rather than being a coalition of parties like those which had existed between 1915 and 1922. However, as the main body of the Labour Party refused to co-operate, the government comprised members from MacDonald's small group of National Labour supporters, the Conservative Party and the Liberal Party.

The Liberal Party was split into three factions. The mainstream party led by Sir Herbert Samuel, who had been the Deputy Leader of the party before the formation of the National Government, continued to support free trade. The Liberal National group led by Sir John Simon had accepted the Conservative policy of protectionism. These two Liberal factions were supporters of the National Ministry. The third group led by David Lloyd George (later to be called the Independent Liberals) had initially supported the creation of the National Government with two of them (Gwilym Lloyd George and Goronwy Owen) taking office. David Lloyd George had been expected to join the government after recovering from surgery following an operation on his prostate as he was still the official leader of the Liberal party. However, he refused to support the calling of a general election, and persuaded his supporters to leave the government and go into opposition.

General election
MacDonald's National Government had not originally been intended to fight a general election, but under Conservative pressure one was soon called. The Samuelite Liberal Party was opposed to a general election but found it could not prevent one. Parliament was dissolved on 8 October 1931.

The 1931 general election took place on 27 October 1931 and led to a landslide victory for candidates supporting the National Government. MacDonald reconstructed his government on 5 November 1931, establishing the 1931-35 National Government.

Cabinet

August 1931 – November 1931
  Ramsay MacDonald – Prime Minister and Leader of the House of Commons
  Lord Sankey – Lord Chancellor
  Stanley Baldwin – Lord President
  Philip Snowden – Chancellor of the Exchequer
  Sir Herbert Samuel – Home Secretary
  Lord Reading – Foreign Secretary and Leader of the House of Lords
  Sir Samuel Hoare – Secretary for India
  J.H. Thomas – Dominions Secretary and Colonial Secretary
  Sir Philip Cunliffe-Lister – President of the Board of Trade
  Neville Chamberlain – Minister of Health

Key
  = Member of National Labour
  = Member of the Conservative Party
  = Member of the Liberal Party

Members of the Ministry
The First National Government was composed of members of the following parties:
  National Labour
  Conservative Party
  Liberal Party

Members of the Cabinet are in bold face.

Notes

Footnotes

References 
 Bassett, Reginald. 1931 Political Crisis (2nd ed., Aldershot: Macmillan 1986) 
 
 Howell, David. MacDonald's Party: Labour Identities and Crisis, 1922-1931 (Oxford U.P. 2002). 
 Hyde, H. Montgomery. Baldwin: The Unexpected Prime Minister (1973)
 Jenkins, Roy.  Baldwin (1987)  excerpt and text search
 Mowat, Charles Loch. Britain between the Wars: 1918-1945 (1955) PP 413–79
 Raymond, John, ed. The Baldwin Age (1960), essays by scholars 252 pages; online
 Smart, Nick.  The National Government. 1931-40 (Macmillan 1999) 
 
 Taylor, A.J.P. English History 1914-1945 (1965) pp 321–88
 Thorpe, Andrew. Britain in the 1930s. The Deceptive Decade, (Oxford: Blackwell, 1992). 
 Williamson, Philip. National Crisis and National Government. British Politics, the Economy and the Empire, 1926-1932, (Cambridge UP, 1992). 
 Cawood, Ian, (10 May 2013), 'Liberal-Conservative Coalitions - ‘a farce and a fraud’?' History & Policy. http://www.historyandpolicy.org/policy-papers/papers/liberal-conservative-coalitions-a-farce-and-a-fraud

Ministry 2
British ministries
1931 establishments in the United Kingdom
1931 disestablishments in the United Kingdom
Political history of the United Kingdom
Ministries of George V
Cabinets established in 1931
Cabinets disestablished in 1931
1930s in the United Kingdom
Interwar Britain
1931 in British politics